Hobiyee, also spelled Hoobiyee, Hobiiyee and Hoobiiyee, is the Nisg̱aʼa new year celebrated every February or March. It signifies the emergence of the first crescent moon and begins the month Buxw-laḵs. Celebrations of Hobiyee are done by Nisg̱aʼa wherever they are located, but the largest celebrations are in Nisg̱aʼa itself and in areas with a large Nisg̱aʼa presence like Vancouver.

Etymology
The  is the bowl of the Nisg̱aʼa wooden spoon. Hobiyee thus signifies the potential for an abundant harvest (or filled spoon) if the crescent moon's edges point upward.

Significance
At Hobiyee, if the crescent moon is seen with its edges pointing upward, it foretells an abundant year of salmon, oolichans, berries and various other foods. The months Buxw-laḵs and X̱saak indicate the end of the winter and the emergence of oolichans in the rivers, the first food supply to arrive when winter resources were depleted ( means 'to blow about' and  means 'needles';  means 'to eat oolichans').

If a star is sitting in the centre of the crescent moon (""), it is a sign of abundance in Nisg̱a’a. Other positions of the stars around the moon have different interpretations. A sideways Hobiyee moon without a star sitting in it denotes a poor year of resources as was the case in 2006

Observance
The  (Nisg̱aʼa chieftains) were responsible for the proper management of resources on their lands as well as studying astrology. Some were considered able "to forecast the weather" and called  (astronomer/astrologist). Grandfathers would keep an eye on the moon, and upon seeing the Hobiyee moon, they would run into the village yelling, "" followed by children raising their arms in the shape of the Hobiyee moon.

The 2017 date of the observance was February 14–15.

References

External links

 Nisg̱a’a Lisims Government
 School District 92 (Nisga’a)
 Gitmax̱mak’ay Nisga’a Prince Rupert/Port Edward Society
 Ging̱olx website
 Nisga’a People of the Rainbow
 Nisgaʼa Museum
 Nass River Indians Movie, Canadianfilm

February observances
Nass Country
 
North Coast of British Columbia
Observances on non-Gregorian calendars
New Year in Canada